The Chief of the Defence Staff is the highest-ranking military officer in the Benin Armed Forces and is responsible for maintaining control over the service branches.

List of officeholders

References

Military of Benin
Benin